Kurram can refer to:

Kurram River, a river on the border between Afghanistan and Pakistan
Kurram Valley, the valley of the Kurram River which runs from Afghanistan to the Indus River
 Kurram District, a district in Pakistan